General Wells may refer to:

Briant H. Wells (1871–1949), U.S. Army major general
Henry Wells (general) (1898–1973), Australian Army lieutenant general
Richard M. Wells (born 1929), U.S. Army major general
William Wells (general) (1837–1892), Union Army brigadier general and brevet major general

See also
Attorney General Wells (disambiguation)